Juan García-Santacruz Ortiz (11 January 1933 – 12 March 2011) was the Roman Catholic bishop of the Roman Catholic Diocese of Guadix, Spain.

Ordained in 1956, he was named bishop in 1992. Ortiz retired in 2009.

Notes

20th-century Roman Catholic bishops in Spain
1933 births
2011 deaths
21st-century Roman Catholic bishops in Spain